Jane Lewson (née Vaughan) (1700?–1816), commonly known as Lady Lewson, was an eccentric woman who claimed to be a supercentenarian. She claimed to be born in 1700 in Strand, London. Early in life she married a wealthy man, who died when she was 26, leaving her with one daughter. When her daughter married she spent the rest of her years as an eccentric widow, living in Coldbath Square and rarely leaving her home despite her considerable wealth. She became well known during her era for the fact that, until her death at the purported age of 116, she continued to wear the fashions of the reign of George I, and hence she became known as Lady Lewson because of her fashion style. She was known for her extreme superstition and fear of getting a cold, which led her to only use one teacup, she smeared herself with pigs fat instead of washing and she would never have her windows washed in case they were broken and let in germs. By the time of her death, it was said they had become so grimy they no longer let in light.

It is speculated that she was probably one of several people who furnished Charles Dickens with the model for his eccentric spinster Miss Havisham in the novel Great Expectations.

References

1816 deaths
Longevity claims